Yamoah is a surname. Notable people with the surname include: 

Adwoa Yamoah (born 1988), Canadian beauty pageant contestant
Alex Yamoah (born 1995), Ghanaian footballer
Samuel Kwadwo Yamoah (born 1956), Ghanaian politician

See also
Yamo (disambiguation)